The House of Words (pol. Dom Słów, formerly known as Chamber of Printing) – museum of typography in Poland, is a multimodal education center. It familiarizes audience with poetry and art, old techniques of printing, and the history and achievements of Lublin printing industry.

Located at Żmigród 1 Street in Lublin, inside Pociej's Palace.

Mission 

According to its statement: the programme of the House of Words is structured around the meaning of written word in cultural and social contexts. Thus institution became an enabler and a new SME in the field of written word and literature.

Foundations 

The museum was located in the pre-war printing house "Popularna", which operated since 1932. Before World War II, authors like Józef Czechowicz and Józef Łobodowski were among its customers. During the occupation from 1939 to 1944 there were illegal brochures printed. In March 1944, acting on tips by informers, the Germans arrested 14 printers of Popularna. They were shot at Majdanek Concentration Camp on 3 June 1944. 
Post war, the printing house became a property of the state, and its user Labor Co-operative "Intrograf", in 1972 has established there a Chamber of Traditional Lublin Printing.

Currently   

The Chamber of Polish Printing Memory has been re-opened on 6 May 2008, driven by "Brama Grodzka – Teatr NN" (Grodzka Gate – NN Theatre). The center has taken over the building in 2006 and fixed it, historic printing machines were also repaired, and can be presently operated. Chamber of Printing besides its permanent exhibitions, presents variety of temporary exhibitions, and leads artistic and educational workshops for youth audience.

See also 
 History of Printing

External links 
 The House of Words - official website
 Explore House of Words in 3D

References 

Buildings and structures in Lublin
Printing museums in Poland